The 15th Lambda Literary Awards were held in 2003 to honour works of LGBT literature published in 2002.

Special awards

Nominees and winners

External links
 15th Lambda Literary Awards

Lambda Literary Awards
Lambda
Lists of LGBT-related award winners and nominees
2003 in LGBT history
2003 awards in the United States